Garrett's Island House is a historic home located near Plymouth, Washington County, North Carolina. It was built about 1760, and is a -story, Georgian / Federal style frame dwelling with a gambrel roof. It has a shed roofed front porch and double-shouldered exterior brick chimney.  Garrett's Island House is thought to be the oldest extant dwelling in Washington County.

It was listed on the National Register of Historic Places in 2001.

References

Houses on the National Register of Historic Places in North Carolina
Georgian architecture in North Carolina
Federal architecture in North Carolina
Houses completed in 1760
Houses in Washington County, North Carolina
National Register of Historic Places in Washington County, North Carolina